Alexander Chase Tapley (born June 3, 1991) is an American professional basketball player who last played for the Tulsa 66ers of the NBA Development League. He played college basketball for the San Diego State University.

High school career
Tapley attended Sacramento Charter High School in Sacramento, California. As a junior, he averaged 22.2 points, 4.8 assists and 4.6 steals per game. As a senior, he averaged 23.2 points. His team was 27-7 that year, and reached the Northern California state finals.

College career
Tapley played for the San Diego State Aztecs, averaging 11.4 points, 3.1 rebounds, and 2.3 assists in 134 games in his four years at the college.

College statistics

|-
| align="left" | 2009–10
| align="left" | San Diego State
| 33 || 17 || 23.4 || .500 || .376 || .714 || 2.30 || 2.2 || 1.1 || .4 || 7.6
|-
| align="left" | 2010–11
| align="left" | San Diego State
| 34 || 31 || 25.5 || .485 || .380 || .828 || 2.4 || 1.9 || 1.3 || .2 || 8.6
|-
| align="left" | 2011–12
| align="left" | San Diego State
| 34 || 34 || 34.0 || .455 || .433 || .723 || 4.3 || 2.3 || 1.8 || .4 || 15.8
|-
| align="left" | 2012–13
| align="left" | San Diego State
| 33 || 32 || 30.8 || .429 || .376 || .803 || 3.2 || 2.7 || 1.4 || .5 || 13.5
|-
| align="left" | Career
| align="left" | 
| 134 || 114 || 28.5 || .460 || .395 || .762 || 3.1 || 2.3 || 1.4 || .4 || 11.4

Professional career
After going undrafted in the 2013 NBA draft, Tapley played two games for Hebraica y Macabi of Uruguay in September 2013. On November 1, 2013, he was selected in the second round of the 2013 NBA D-League draft by the Tulsa 66ers.

On November 4, 2014, Tapley was acquired by the Oklahoma City Blue. He was later waived by Oklahoma City on November 13, 2014.

NBA D-League career statistics

Regular season

|-
| align="left" | 2013–14
| align="left" | Tulsa 66ers
| 12 || 0 || 14.9 || .467 || .286 || .667 || 1.2 || .9 || .8 || .1 || 5.5
|-
| align="left" | Career
| align="left" | 
| 12 || 0 || 14.9 || .467 || .286 || .667 || 1.2 || .9 || .8 || .1 || 5.5

References

External links
San Diego State bio
NBA D-League Profile

1991 births
Living people
American expatriate basketball people in Uruguay
American men's basketball players
Basketball players from Sacramento, California
San Diego State Aztecs men's basketball players
Shooting guards
Tulsa 66ers players